Tatalina LRRS Airport  is a military airstrip located seven nautical miles (8.1 miles; 13 km) south of Takotna, in the Yukon–Koyukuk Census Area of the U.S. state of Alaska. It is not open for public use.

Overview
Tatalina Airport is a United States Air Force military airstrip. Its mission is to provide access to the Tatalina Long Range Radar Site for servicing and other requirements.

The airstrip was constructed as part of the construction of the Tatalina Air Force Station. During the station's operational use as a manned radar station, it provided transportation for station personnel and for supplies and equipment to be airlifted to the station. With the manned radar station's closure in 1983, the airstrip now provides access to the unattended site for maintenance personnel and other requirements.

It is not staffed by any support personnel, and is not open to the public. During the winter months, it may be inaccessible due to the extreme weather conditions at the location.

Facilities and aircraft 
Tatalina LRRS Airport has one runway designated 16/34 with a gravel surface measuring 3,800 by 150 feet (1,158 x 46 m). For the 12-month period ending July 17, 1978, the airport had 1,650 aircraft operations, an average of 137 per month: 91% air taxi and 9% general aviation.

References

External links 

Installations of the United States Air Force in Alaska
Airports in the Yukon–Koyukuk Census Area, Alaska